The term Battle of Abu-Ageila may refer to the following events:

 Battles of the Sinai (1948), including a battle for Umm Katef – Abu Ageila, in the 1948 Arab–Israeli War
 Battle of Abu-Ageila (1956) during the Suez Crisis
 Battle of Abu-Ageila (1967) during the Six-Day War